Crociata is a surname. Notable people with the surname include:

Giovanni Crociata (born 1997), Italian footballer
Mariano Crociata (born 1953), Italian Roman Catholic bishop

Italian-language surnames